It's Not Me, It's You is a 2009 album by Lily Allen.

It's Not Me, It's You may also refer to:

"It's Not Me, It's You" (song), 2011 song by Skillet
It's Not Me, It's You (game show), British comedy panel game show
It's Not Me, It's You!, book by Jon Richardson
"It's Not Me It's You", 2001 song by Prozzäk

See also
It's not you, it's me, a popular phrase
Not Me (disambiguation)